The Royal Canadian Air Force Command Chief Warrant Officer is the senior non-commissioned officer in the Royal Canadian Air Force. 

They act as an advisor to the Commander of the RCAF on matters affecting all ranks in matters related to dress, discipline, morale and welfare, and quality of life.

Specifically, they are responsible for:

 Understanding the issues that personnel face through regular engagements with the aviators of the RCAF
 Promoting and motivating personnel to achieve the core values of the RCAF: Professionalism, Excellence and Teamwork
 Acting as caretaker of RCAF history and heritage and promoting its importance
 Managing the professional development of RCAF non-commissioned members
 Identifying, tracking and mentoring individuals to achieve senior appointments and positions in the Canadian Armed Forces

List of Royal Canadian Air Force Command Chief Warrant Officers

References

Royal Canadian Air Force
Warrant officers